Giannetti is a surname. Notable people with the surname include:

It may refer to:

 Alfredo Giannetti (1924–1995), Italian screenwriter and film editor
 Alyssa Giannetti (born 1994), American footballer
 Eduardo Giannetti da Fonseca (born 1957), Brazilian economist and author
 Filippo Giannetti or Giannetto (1630–1702), Italian painter
 John A. Giannetti Jr. (born 1964), American politician
 Niccolò Giannetti (born 1991), Italian footballer

See also
 Gianetti

Italian-language surnames
Patronymic surnames
Surnames from given names